The Burmese flying barb (Esomus ahli ) is a species of cyprinid fish endemic to Myanmar.

References

Cyprinid fish of Asia
Fish of Myanmar
Fish described in 1928
Esomus